"Rage to Love" is the third and final single from Teases & Dares, the fourth studio album by Kim Wilde. Released in April 1985, the song was remixed by Dave Edmunds for its release as a single. It became Wilde's biggest UK hit for three years, reaching the UK Top 20. The B-side —a cover version of the Shirelles' "Putty in Your Hands"—is an exclusive non-album track. A six-minute extended version of "Rage to Love" was included on the 12" single.

Track listing
Side A
"Rage to Love" (Ricki Wilde/Marty Wilde) – 3:50
Side B
"Putty in Your Hands" (J. Patton/K. Rogers) – 3:01

Chart performance

References

External links

1985 singles
Kim Wilde songs
1985 songs
Songs written by Marty Wilde
Songs written by Ricky Wilde
MCA Records singles
Rockabilly songs